The 61st New York Infantry Regiment, also known as the "Astor Regiment", was an infantry regiment of the Union Army during the American Civil War.

Service
The regiment was organized in New York City on October 25, 1861, and was mustered in for a three-year enlistment in October, November, and December, 1861; the regiment was formed by consolidation of the Astor Rifles (or Regiment) with the Clinton Guards. At the expiration of its term of service, the men entitled thereto were discharged and the regiment retained in service, but at the same time consolidating Companies G and K into the other companies; on December 20, 1864, the men of the 54th New York Volunteer Infantry not mustered out with their regiment were transferred, forming the new Companies G and K.

The companies were all recruited principally in New York City, except Company C at Madison (now Colgate) University, Hamilton, and the second Company I, recruited in Albany and vicinity.

The regiment left the State November 9, 1861; served at Washington, D. C., from November 10, 1861; in Howard's Brigade, Sumner's Division, Army of the Potomac, from November 27, 1861; in Howard's, 1st, Brigade, Richardson's, 1st, Division, 2d Corps, Army of the Potomac, from March 13, 1862-; in 3d Brigade, 1st Division, 2d Corps, from July, 1862- in 1st Brigade 1st Division, 2d Corps, from September, 1862; in 2d Brigade, 1st Division 2d Corps, from October, 1862; in 1st Brigade, 1st Division, 2d Corps, from November, 1862; and it was mustered out and honorably discharged July 14, 1865, at Alexandria, Virginia.

The 1908 book The Union army: a history of military affairs in the loyal states, 1861-65 -- records of the regiments in the Union army -- cyclopedia of battles -- memoirs of commanders and soldiers gives the following description of the regiment's service:

Total strength and casualties
The total enrollment of the command was 1,526 members; during its service the regiment lost by death, killed in action, 11 officers, 113 enlisted men of wounds received in action, 5 officers, 67 enlisted men; of disease and other causes, 2 officers 134 enlisted men; total, 18 officers, 314 enlisted men; aggregate, 332; of whom 46 enlisted men died in the hands of the enemy.

Commanders
Colonel Spencer W. Cone
 Colonel Francis Channing Barlow
 Colonel Nelson Appleton Miles
 Lieutenant Colonel Oscar Broady
 Colonel George Washington Scott

See also

List of New York Civil War regiments

Notes

References
 
The Civil War Archive

External links
New York State Military Museum Unit History Project New York State Military Museum and Veterans Research Center - Civil War - 61st Infantry Regiment History, photographs, table of battles and casualties, and historical sketch for the 61st New York Infantry Regiment.
 National Park Service UNION NEW YORK VOLUNTEERS 61st Regiment, New York Infantry
 Antietam on the Web Federal Regiment61st New York Infantry

Infantry 061
1861 establishments in New York (state)
Military units and formations established in 1861
Military units and formations disestablished in 1865